Radcliffe-on-Trent is a large village and civil parish in the Rushcliffe borough of Nottinghamshire, England. The population of the civil parish at the Census 2011 was 8,205.

Location
Radcliffe has a population of about 8,000. It is to the east of Nottingham, close to but not part of the Greater Nottingham built-up area. However, the Greater Nottingham Partnership sees the whole of Rushcliffe as part of the conurbation. The village lies on the south bank and cliff overlooking the River Trent. The "Rad" part of its name is a corruption of the Old English for red, in reference to the dark red colour of the cliffs, which are formed of Triassic red shale with gypsum banding. Nearby places are Shelford, East Bridgford, Holme Pierrepont and Stoke Bardolph.

To the south-east of the parish lies the former Saxondale Hospital, which has been redeveloped into some 350 dwellings and renamed Upper Saxondale. Harlequin, a small mainly residential area, lies between it and Radcliffe, which is mainly on the northern side of the major, east-west, A52 trunk road. At its western end it the Radcliffe Road runs along the north-eastern edge of Trent Bridge cricket ground. Radcliffe has a railway station connecting it to Nottingham and beyond in the west and Grantham and beyond to the east. The village is served by the Trentbarton bus company, which runs daily services to Nottingham – once every 10 minutes on weekdays.

Places of worship
The village has an Anglican parish church, St. Mary's, and Roman Catholic and Methodist churches.

Recreation
The village has a number of community spaces, such as Cliff Walk (which runs beside the river to nearby Shelford village), Rockley Memorial Park, a recreation ground and skate park, and a complex of sports fields at the eastern end of the village. There is an amateur dramatics group which stages regular productions at the Grange Hall, as well as numerous other clubs and associations.

There are local branches of the Boys' Brigade and Scouts. The village has four public houses, its own football, golf and cricket clubs. In 1999 the village was twinned with Bussy-St-Georges, a French town which lies east of Paris. 

Radcliffe has an infant and nursery school, a junior school and a medium-sized secondary, South Nottinghamshire Academy, formerly known as Dayncourt School.

Famous residents
John Boot, the founder of the pharmacy chain Boots, was born in Radcliffe in 1815.

The 19th-century Nottinghamshire and England cricket captain George Parr was born and died in the village. He also played for the Radcliffe on Trent Cricket Club. Evidence of the Parr family's long association with Radcliffe appears in several street and building names.

Gary Mills, who played in the victorious 1980 European Cup Final, making him the youngest finalist in European Cup history, still lives in Radcliffe

The actor Tom Graham who played Tom Archer for 17 years (1997–2014) in the long running BBC Radio 4 programme The Archers was raised and went to school in Radcliffe.

References

Bibliography

Footnotes

External links

Parish council

 
Villages in Nottinghamshire
Civil parishes in Nottinghamshire
Rushcliffe